A convention travel document may refer to either:

 a 1954 Convention Travel Document, issued under the 1954 Convention Relating to the Status of Stateless Persons, or
 a Refugee travel document, issued under the 1951 Convention Relating to the Status of Refugees.